Francis Wollaston may refer to:

 Francis Wollaston (scientist) (1694–1774), English scientist and father of the below astronomer
 Francis Wollaston (astronomer) (1731–1815), Anglican priest, author and father of the below philosopher
 Francis Wollaston (philosopher) (1762–1823), Anglican Archdeacon of Essex and Jacksonian Professor of natural philosopher